The 30th Rhythmic Gymnastics European Championships took place from June 10 to June 15, 2014 at the newly opened National Gymnastics Arena in Baku, Azerbaijan. 33 participating federations with their juniors and seniors gymnasts participated at the event.

Participating countries
List of delegations participating in Championship.

Schedule
 Wednesday, June 11
08h00 - 22h00     Official Training 
18h00      Briefing session with the Heads of delegation
 Thursday, June 12
08h00 - 22h00     Official Training
 Friday, June 13
09h30 - 11h15    C I - Juniors, Group A - Hoop + Ball
11h50 - 13h50     C I - Juniors, Group B - Hoop + Ball
14h45 - 16h30     C I - Juniors, Group C - Hoop + Ball
17h00 - 17h55     Opening Ceremony
17h55 - 20h45     C I - Seniors groups alternating 10 Clubs / 3 Balls - 2 Ribbons
20h45     Award Ceremony - Seniors group all-around competition I
 Saturday, June 14
09h30 - 11h30     C I - Juniors, Group B - clubs + ribbon
11h50 - 13h50     C I - Juniors, Group C - clubs + ribbon
14h30 - 16 h 30   C I - Juniors, Group A - clubs + ribbon
16h30 - 17h00     Award Ceremony - Junior Team competition I
17h00 - 19h00     C II - Seniors, Group B - 4 apparatus (place 11 to 20 from ECh 2013)
19h15 - 21h15     C II - Seniors, Group A - 4 apparatus (place 01 to 10 from ECh 2013)
21h15     Award Ceremony - Senior individual all-around competition II
 Sunday, June 15
12h00 - 13h00     Competition III - Juniors - Hoop and Ball
13h00 - 14h00     Competition III - Juniors - Clubs and Ribbon
14h30 - 16h20     Competition III - Senior groups - 10 Clubs, 3 Balls and 2 Ribbons
16h30     Gala and Closing Ceremony

Overview
The 20 best senior individuals from 2013 will compete at the multiple competition (CII).
 
102 juniors (from 32 NF) will participate in the qualifying competition I (CI) and team competition and the final competition (4 apparatus) (CIII), 21 senior groups (consisted of 6 gymnasts) will present two different voluntary exercises, one executed with one apparatus (clubs), the other with different apparatus (3 balls/2 ribbons) on the occasion of the competition I (general competition) and the competition III (final competition for each exercise). At the European Championships in even years, the 20 best gymnasts from competition I of the previous year present their routines.

Controversies
According to Armenian sources, organizers of the European Championships in Rhythmic Gymnastics in Baku asked the Belarusian Group to give up using the music of Armenian composer Aram Khachaturian, at a press conference in Minsk reported by the head coach Irina Leparskaya. The Group had performed under Khachaturian's "Sabre Dance" in their 2 Ribbons + 3 Balls routine, but had to change the exercise under a different music 2 weeks before the start of the Championships event. As spokeswoman, Samaya Mamedova, Minister of Youth and Sports of Azerbaijan, said not interfere in any federations decisions:
Regarding Belarus, we didn't ask them to abandon their music. This decision was taken by Belarus itself. This is another provocative information spread by Armenians to tarnish Azerbaijan as organizer of the European Championships of Rhythmic Gymnastics.

The usually medal contenders Belarusian Group finished 17th in all-around and placed last in 2 Ribbons + 3 Balls qualification score amongst 21 countries during the European Championships. Armenia did not compete and send any delegations at the championships.

Medal winners

Results

Seniors

Individual all-around

Group all-around

Group 10 clubs

Group 3 balls + 2 ribbons

Juniors

Team

Hoop

Ball

Clubs

Ribbon

Medal count

Seniors

Juniors

References

External links

European Union of Gymnastics
Rhythmic Gymnastics Results

Rhythmic Gymnastics European Championships
European Rhythmic Gymnastics Championships
Rhythmic Gymnastics European Championships
Sports competitions in Baku
International gymnastics competitions hosted by Azerbaijan